A multiplex or mux (called virtual sub-channel in the United States and Canada, and bouquet in France) is a grouping of program services as interleaved data packets for broadcast over a network or modulated multiplexed medium. The program services are split out at the receiving end.

In the United Kingdom, a terrestrial multiplex (usually abbreviated mux) has a fixed bandwidth of 8 MHz CODFM of interleaved H.222 packets containing a number of channels. In the United States, a similar arrangement using 6 MHz 8VSB is often described as a channel with virtual sub-channels.

Pay television multiplexes
In regards to television, the term multiplex is often used to refer to a single broadcaster offering multiple channels of programming as a single bundle to its subscribers. The term is most synonymous with premium television services, such as those devoted to films (where the term evokes the symbolism of multiplex cinemas) or sports; for instance, film services may operate multiplex channels devoted to specific genres and traits (such as action, classic, comedy, drama and romance, or family films) alongside their primary flagship channel, while sports services may place specific events or sports on specific channels.

Multiplex channels are not necessarily sold separately on an a la carte basis from their parent and sister channels.

Digital subchannels

Analog television channels, whether terrestrial, cable or satellite, are transmitted as a single program service uncompressed at the same fixed bandwidth, which fills the entire bandwidth available. Digital television channels can be interleaved and are in a highly compressed format, so that the bandwidth they require varies due to the bitrate provided to each channel; it is more cost efficient to transmit several channels together so that they share the same bandwidth, each channel has carefully constrained bitrates allocated, so that the sum of all channels fill the fixed bandwidth provided. A group of program services transmitted within a particular bandwidth allocation is erroneously known as a multiplex; or the channels may be called subchannels. Sometimes, when analog transmissions are replaced by digital, the fixed bandwidth of one analog broadcast is allocated to the program services; the bandwidth of one analog broadcast is sufficient for several compressed channels.

A set-top box or integrated digital television is required to tune in, receive, and split a channel for viewing. An H.222 transport can contain (depending on the bit-rate available) half a dozen television channels yet uses the same space of just one analog broadcast. 

Any program services, not necessarily from the same broadcaster, can be interleaved on the same transport. Programming from a commercial broadcaster that would not otherwise be available in the station's broadcast area can be transmitted. 

Digital television transports vary in the number of channels that can be transmitted, based on the bandwidth of the multiplex and the broadcast quality specified for each channel. Digital terrestrial offers the least, digital cable and satellite the most bandwidth. 

A single transport may carry conventional television channels, radio, teletext, and sometimes hidden channels carrying metadata or interactive services.

United States
In the United States, the standard for over-the-air digital transmissions is ATSC, digital cable is based on the worldwide DVB standard, DVB-C ("C" for cable) and transmission via satellite are based on the DVB-S ("S" for satellite) standard, all use multiplexes to deliver various channels to the viewer. Smaller and newer commercial networks, such as The CW and MyNetworkTV, are available in some markets as digital subchannels of stations affiliated with other networks rather than as standalone stations. A transport can also carry radio and interactive television content.

A typical American ATSC transport offers three to four channels; in most cases one of them is broadcast in HD (the station's main channel) and the rest of the channels are broadcast in standard definition, due to the limited 6 MHz 8VSB bandwidth used. In those cases when one physical channel transports more than one HD sub-channel, the data rate drops to the level of standard definition DVD-Video. The corresponding image degradation manifests itself in reduced resolution, increased noise and compression artifacts. For example, KPBS broadcasts four multiplexes on a single physical channel, two of which are HD.

Europe
In Europe, transports are used on CODFM 64-QAM/256-QAM modulated DVB-T and DVB-T2 ("T" for terrestrial) digital terrestrial standards, on CODFM 256-QAM modulated DVB-C digital cable and on CODFM QPSK/8PSK modulated DVB-S digital satellite. Publicly and privately owned television broadcasters use interleaving to broadcast many digital channels over a few transports using the various digital broadcast standards. A typical DVB-T transport in Europe offers four or more standard definition channels transmitted simultaneously; if some channels transmit only for part of the day (for example, a children's channel during daytime, a channel with programs for adults in the evening), many channels may share the same transport.

External links 
 Technical list of UK multiplexes

Digital television